Ditte Vind (born 2 January 1994) is a Danish handball player who currently plays for Fleury Loiret HB.

Achievements 
Danish Cup
Bronze Medalist: 2017
Damehåndboldligaen
Winner: 2017

References
 

1994 births
Living people
Sportspeople from Odense
Danish female handball players